Gregory Rudelson (born March 17, 1988) is an Israeli judoka and belt wrestler.

Sports career
In the Israeli Championships in judo, Rudelson came in second in the U 100 in 2006 and 2007, second in the O100 in 2009, 2012, and 2014, and won the championship in the O100 in 2013.

In the European Cup Juniors in judo he won the 2007 A-Tournament U20 in Manisa in the U100, and won a silver medal in the A-Tournament U20 Manisa in the O100.

He took fifth place in the 2007 European U20 Championships in judo in Prague in the U100.

In the 2009 Maccabiah Games in judo he won a silver medal in the U100.

He competed in belt wrestling at the 2013 Summer Universiade in Men's Classic Style, and won a bronze medal in the +100 kg category.

References

External links
 
 

Living people
Maccabiah Games silver medalists for Israel
1988 births
Israeli male judoka
Competitors at the 2009 Maccabiah Games
Israeli male sport wrestlers
Medalists at the 2013 Summer Universiade
21st-century Israeli people